Marine Scout Bombing Squadron 245 (VMSB-245) was a dive bomber squadron in the United States Marine Corps during World War II.  The squadron, also known as the “Red Mousie Squadron”, operated from Midway and Makin Atolls, Majuro and Ulithi while overseas.  The squadron was decommissioned on November 17, 1945, shortly after the end of the war.

History
VMSB-245 was commissioned at Marine Corps Air Station El Toro on July 1, 1943.  After training for a few months, the squadron deployed to Marine Corps Air Station Ewa, Hawaii arriving there on December 31, 1943.  On January 5, 1944, it moved to Midway Atoll to conduct anti-submarine patrol duty.  The squadron returned to MCAS Ewa on April 1, 1944.

On May 5, 1944, the squadron left Hawaii on board the USS Copahee headed for Majuro  where they arrived on May 15.  Later in the same month, they moved to Makin Atoll from which they conducted combat operations against bypassed Japanese garrisons in the Marshall Islands from June 1 until October 29, 1944.  Late October saw the squadron move back to Majuro where they continued carrying out strikes. 

On 6 January 1945, two VMSB-245 SBD Dauntless dive bombers mistook the United States Navy submarine  for a Japanese submarine and dropped two depth charges on her after she submerged off Majuro. Spadefish suffered only superficial damage and no casualties. March 1945 saw the squadron move again, this time to Ulithi, where it remained until the end of the war in August 1945.

VMSB-245 was decommissioned on November 17, 1945.

See also

 United States Marine Corps Aviation
 List of active United States Marine Corps aircraft squadrons
 List of decommissioned United States Marine Corps aircraft squadrons

Notes

References
Books

 

 Hinman, Charles R., and Douglas E. Campbell. The Submarine Has No Friends: Friendly Fire Incidents Involving U.S. Submarines During World War II. Syneca Research Group, Inc., 2019. .

Web

SBD
Inactive units of the United States Marine Corps
Friendly fire incidents of World War II